Fan Li(October 22, 536 BC - 448 BC) from the Spring and Autumn period, was an ancient Chinese military strategist, politician, and businessman. Fàn Li was an important political and military advisor to Goujian, the king of Yue. He later was known as Tao Zhu Gong (陶朱公) a name he took after achieving a decisive victory for Yue over the state of Wu and retiring to live a secluded life with his wife Xi Shi, one of the most famous beauties in Chinese history.

Biography
Along with King Goujian of Yue, Fàn Li was once a hostage of the state of Wu. After three years of captivity the two of them returned to Yue where Fàn Li helped Goujian carry out a host of reforms to streamline the administration of the Yue state. In 473 BCE, Yue was finally able to destroy the state of Wu. After the victory, Fàn resigned and renamed himself Tao Zhu Gong. After his departure, he was said to have written a letter to Wen Zhong from Qi, advising Wen Zhong to leave Goujian's service.  Wen took notice of the advice in the letter and later was able to escape to Qi, living his remaining days there.

After retiring from his ministerial post he lived with Xi Shi, one of the renowned Four Beauties of ancient China, on a fishing boat, roaming the misty wilderness of Lake Tai in the style of the Taoist immortals of old. In his later years, he became a legend for his success in business, and was posthumously worshipped as a god of money, or the God of Wealth (Cai Shen).

Fàn Li was an ancestor of Fan Zhongyan, a famous chancellor and historical figure from the Song Dynasty.

References

6th-century BC Chinese people
5th-century BC Chinese people
Chinese merchants
Chinese philanthropists
Yue (state)
Zhou dynasty politicians